C17 is the informal name for ISO/IEC 9899:2018, the most recent standard for the C programming language, prepared in 2017 and published in June 2018. It replaced C11 (standard ISO/IEC 9899:2011).  C17 will be superseded by C2x.

Since it was under development in 2017, and officially published in 2018, C17 is also commonly referred to as C18. GCC, for example, treats the commands -std=c17 and -std=c18 as equivalent, and the C-Standard page on the ISO-9899 wiki refers to ISO/IEC 9899:2018 as C18, only noting later that the standard is sometimes called C17.

Changes from C11 

C17 addressed defects in C11 without introducing new language features.

The __STDC_VERSION__ macro is increased to the value 201710L.

For a detailed list of changes from the previous standard, see Clarification Request Summary for C11.

Compiler support 
List of compilers supporting C17:
 GCC 8.1.0
 LLVM Clang 7.0.0
 IAR EWARM v8.40.1
 Microsoft Visual C++ VS 2019 (16.8)
 Pelles C 9.00

See also 

 C++23, C++20, C++17, C++14, C++11, C++03, C++98, versions of the C++ programming language standard
 Compatibility of C and C++

References

External links 
 N2176, archived final draft of the standard
 

C (programming language)
Programming language standards
IEC standards
ISO standards